OVO is a 2000 album by Peter Gabriel.

OVO may also refer to:
OvO (band), an Italian rock band
Ovo (Cirque du Soleil), a touring Cirque du Soleil show
OVO (payment service), an Indonesian digital payment and fintech company
OVO (video encyclopedia), an Italian- and English-language online reference
OVO Energy, a British gas and electricity supplier
OVO Hydro, a multi-purpose indoor arena in Glasgow, Scotland, the largest entertainment venue in Scotland.
OVO Mobile, an Australian telecommunications provider
OVO Sound, a brand and record label founded by rapper and singer Drake